John Ellington may refer to:
 John J. Ellington, American judge
 John B. Ellington Jr., general in the Air National Guard